Virginie Thévenet (born 12 January 1957, in Paris) is a French actress, director and screenwriter.

Films with Virginie Thévenet as actress
 1970 : Les Stances de Sophie, by Moshé Mizrahi
 1972 : Faustine et le Bel Été
 1972 : Les Zozos, by Pascal Thomas, Martine
 1976 : Small Change, by François Truffaut
 1976 : La Surprise du chef, by Pascal Thomas,  Sabine
 1977 : Une sale histoire, by Jean Eustache
 1977 : La Nuit tous les chats sont gris , by Gérard Zingg, Jeannette
 1978 : La Tortue sur le dos , by Luc Béraud, Nathalie
 1981 : Quartet, by James Ivory, Mademoiselle Chardin
 1981 : L'Année prochaine... si tout va bien , bye Jean-Loup Hubert, The girl who loves comics
 1982 : Le Beau Mariage, by Éric Rohmer, La mariée
 1983 : Debout les crabes, la mer monte !, by Jean-Jacques Grand-Jouan, Agnès
 1984 : Il ne faut jurer de rien , by Christian Vincent (director) (short film)
 1984 : Les Nuits de la pleine lune, by Éric Rohmer,  Camille
 1985 : Rosette vend des roses , by Rosette
 1987 : Rosette cherche une chambre , by Rosette
 1987 : Le Cri du hibou, by Claude Chabrol, Véronique
 1988 : Ada dans la jungle, by Gérard Zingg

Films directed by Virginie Thévenet
 La Nuit porte-jarretelles (1984)
 Jeux d'artifices (1986)
 Sam suffit (1992)

External links
Official web site

1957 births
Living people
Actresses from Paris
French film actresses
Film directors from Paris
20th-century French actresses
French women film directors
French women screenwriters
French screenwriters